Johnson Field  is a privately owned public use airport located one nautical mile (1.85 km) northeast of the central business district of Smiths Creek, in St. Clair County, Michigan, United States.

Facilities 
It has one runway designated 7/25 with a turf surface measuring 2,530 by 60 feet (771 x 18 m).

For the 12-month period ending December 31, 2014, the airport had 50 aircraft operations, an average of 4 per month: all general aviation. In January 2017, there were 2 aircraft based at this airport: 2 ultra-light.

References

External links 
  from Michigan DOT
 Aerial image as of 24 April 2000 from USGS The National Map

Airports in Michigan
Buildings and structures in St. Clair County, Michigan
Transportation in St. Clair County, Michigan
Airports in the Upper Peninsula of Michigan